All My Love may refer to:

Music

Albums
 All My Love, 1970 album by Cliff Richard
 All My Love (Peabo Bryson album), 1989
 All My Love, 1990 album by American guitarist Esteban
 All My Love (SS501 album), 2009, or the title track
 All My Love, 2013 album by Lenny

Songs

 "All My Love" (Richard Beynon and Zen Freeman featuring CeCe Peniston song), 2013
 "All My Love" (Cash Cash song), a 2017 song by Cash Cash featuring Conor Maynard
 "All My Love" (Renée Geyer song), a 1985 single by Renée Geyer
 "All My Love" (Major Lazer song), a 2014 song by Major Lazer featuring Ariana Grande
 "All My Love" (Queen Pen song), a 1998 single by Queen Pen
 "All My Love" (Patti Page song), a 1950 song popularized by Patti Page
 "All My Love (Solo Tu)", a song released as a single in 1967 by Cliff Richard
 "All My Love" (Led Zeppelin song), a 1979 song by Led Zeppelin
 "All My Love" (Watermät, Becky Hill and Tai song), a 2015 song by Watermät, Becky Hill and Tai
 "All of My Love" (Destiny Chukunyere song), 2020
 "All My Love", a song by Joe Ely from Joe Ely
 "All My Love", a 2001 song by A-Teens
 "All My Love", a 2015 song by Nyanda
 "All My Love", a 2015 song by Shane Filan from You and Me
 "All My Love", a 2021 song by London Grammar from Californian Soil
 "All My Love", a 2017 song by Why Don't We
 "(You Were Made for) All My Love", a 1960 song by Jackie Wilson

Other uses
 All My Love (TV series), a 2010 South Korean sitcom

See also
 
 All My Loving (disambiguation)